The western lyre snake (Trimorphodon biscutatus) is a mildly venomous colubrid snake native to Mexico.

Description 
They are a moderately sized snake, attaining lengths of approximately 1 meter at adult size. They are generally a brown,  tan or grey in color with dark brown blotching down the back. They have large eyes with vertical pupils.

Behavior 
They are nocturnal and secretive, spending most of their time in rock crevices, and other areas difficult for potential predators to access. Their diet consists of lizards, small rodents, frogs, and bats. Their venom is not considered to be harmful to humans.

References

External links 
Yahooligans: Western Lyre Snake

Colubrids
Reptiles of Mexico
Reptiles described in 1854
Taxa named by André Marie Constant Duméril
Taxa named by Gabriel Bibron